Brett Winslow (born September 8, 1967, in Santa Barbara, California) is a former American volleyball player, who was a member of the United States men's national volleyball team that finished in ninth place at the 1996 Summer Olympics in Atlanta, Georgia. 

Winslow played volleyball at Long Beach State University and was the team captain of the 1991 national title squad. His jersey was retired on March 15, 2014.

References

External links
 Profile

1967 births
Living people
American men's volleyball players
Volleyball players at the 1996 Summer Olympics
Olympic volleyball players of the United States
Sportspeople from Santa Barbara, California
Long Beach State Beach men's volleyball players